John Adams, D.D.  was an academic in the eighteenth century.

Adams was born at Newport, Shropshire and educated at Sidney Sussex College, Cambridge. He was elected a Fellow of Sidney Sussex College, Cambridge in 1714; and ordained a priest of the Church of England on 23 December 1716. Adams was Master of Sidney from 1730 until his death on 12 August 1746; and Vice-Chancellor of the University of Cambridge from 1735 to 1736.

Notes

1746 deaths
Masters of Sidney Sussex College, Cambridge
Fellows of Sidney Sussex College, Cambridge
Alumni of Sidney Sussex College, Cambridge
Vice-Chancellors of the University of Cambridge
Clergy from Shropshire
18th-century English Anglican priests